Martin R. Steele (born 15 September 1946) is a retired United States Marine Corps lieutenant general.  He served in combat during the Vietnam War and in Operations Desert Shield and Desert Storm. He served for 35 years in the Marine Corps before retiring in 1999.  He then became the President and CEO of the Intrepid Sea, Air & Space Museum in New York City.

Early years and education
Martin R. Steele was born in Philadelphia, Pennsylvania.  He grew up in Fayetteville, Arkansas.  He earned a Bachelor of Arts degree from the University of Arkansas (1974) and Masters of Arts degrees from Central Michigan University (1981), Salve Regina College (1985) and the Naval War College (1985).  His military education includes the Armor Officer Advanced Course, the Marine Corps Command and Staff College and the Naval War College.

Military career
Steele enlisted in the U.S. Marine Corps in January 1965. His initial tour of duty was with the 1st Tank Battalion, 1st Marine Division, Camp Pendleton, California, during which he deployed to the Republic of Vietnam. Subsequently, assigned as a corporal to Officer Candidates School, he was commissioned a second lieutenant in January 1967.

In 1973, he returned to Camp Pendleton and served as a tank company commander, battalion S-3, and Aide-de-Camp to the Commanding General of the 1st Marine Division.

An overseas assignment as an assault amphibian vehicle company commander and battalion S-3 was followed by duty as the Marine Corps Liaison Officer to the project Manager M-60/M-1 Tank programs at the U.S. Army Tank-Automotive command in Warren, MI. He also served at Headquarters Marine Corps as the Tank Acquisition Project Officer.

In August 1985, Steele returned to the 1st Marine Division, where he served initially as the Commanding Officer, 1st Light Armored Vehicle Battalion until June 1986, and then as the Commanding Officer, 1st Tank Battalion until June 1988. The following month, he transferred overseas where he was assigned as Operations Officer, C/J/G-3, Combined Forces Command, Republic of Korea. Upon his return from overseas in August 1990, he assumed the duties as the Deputy Director, Marine Air-Ground Task Force Warfighting Center, MCCDC Quantico.

In July 1992, he was assigned duty as the Director, Warfighting Development Integration Division at Quantico. While serving in this capacity, he was selected in March 1993 for promotion to brigadier general; and was promoted on May 20, 1993, and was assigned duty as Commanding General, Marine Corps Base Quantico on June 15, 1993.

Steele next served as the Director for Strategic Planning and Policy, J-5, U.S. Forces Pacific at Camp H.M. Smith, Hawaii from 1995 to 1997. While serving in this capacity, he was selected in December 1996 for promotion to lieutenant general. His final assignment was as Deputy Chief of Staff for Plans, Policies and Operations at Headquarters Marine Corps.  Steele retired from the Marine Corps in August 1999 after 35 years of service.

Post-Marine Corps
Steele became the President and CEO of the Intrepid Sea, Air & Space Museum  in June 1999, leading the organization until Summer 2002.  He continues to serve the museum as a trustee emeritus.

Awards and decorations
LtGen Martin Steele has been awarded the following: 
 

He also received the Vietnam Civil Actions Medal Unit Citation as well as several awards of both the Expert Rifle and Expert Pistol badges.

See also

References

''This article incorporates text in the public domain from the United States Marine Corps.

Further reading
  Tells the story of three men who completed their Marine Corps officer's training at the Basic School in 1967 — General James L. Jones Jr., MajGen Ray Smith, and LtGen "Marty" Steele.

External links

Living people
People from Fayetteville, Arkansas
Recipients of the Legion of Merit
United States Marines 
United States Marine Corps generals
Recipients of the Defense Superior Service Medal
Recipients of the Defense Distinguished Service Medal
Recipients of the Navy Distinguished Service Medal
1946 births